Potiskum Airport  is an airstrip serving Potiskum in Yobe State, Nigeria. A second, east–west runway may have been active in the past.

See also
Transport in Nigeria
List of airports in Nigeria

References

Airports in Nigeria
Airstrip